The 1957 1000 km Buenos Aires took place on 20 January, on the Circuito de la Costanera Norte, (Buenos Aires, Argentina).  It was the fourth running of the race, and once again, it was opening round of the F.I.A. World Sports Car Championship. For this event, was moved from its previous venue, the Autódromo Municipal-Avenida Paz, only to return to the Autódromo in 1958.

Report

Entry

A grand total of 30 racing cars were registered for this event, of which all 30 arrived for practice and 24 for qualifying for the race. Although this was the first major sports car race of the year, as in previous years, the race was poorly supported by the work of teams. Again, only Ferrari and Maserati sent cars from Europe. Both teams were represented by multiple cars in the race. Ferrari send two Ferrari 290 S and a single Ferrari 290 MM, but also loaned works driver to the Americans entered 290 MM of Scuderia Temple Buell during the meeting. Meanwhile, Officine Alfieri Maserati was represented a four different cars, across five entries. The remaining bulk of the field, were cars from South American teams.

Unlike the previous 1000 km Buenos Aires races, the Automóvil Club Argentino decided the race should take place at a different venue, instead of the Autódromo Municipal-Avenida Paz. They choose the Circuito de la Costanera Norte, which used the wide service roads of the Aeroparque Jorge Newbery. The reason for the change was that need to move to a “safer” track.

Qualifying

After a three-hour qualifying session held on the prior to the race, the local hero, Juan Manuel Fangio took pole position for Officine Alfieri Maserati, in their Maserati 450S.

Race

The race was held over 98 laps of the 6.350 mile, Circuito de la Costanera Norte, giving a distance of 622.281 miles (1,001.462 km). in front of an estimated crowd of 100,000, it was the winner of the 1956 race, Stirling Moss, Fangio’s team-mate, who took an early lead from the entire fleet of Ferraris, piloted by Eugenio Castellotti, Peter Collins, Alfonso de Portago and Masten Gregory in the Temple Buell Ferrari. Jean Behra appears next in sixth. At the end of lap one, Castellotti pits with differential problems and loses more than seven minutes, and hands the car over to Luigi Musso. During the second lap, the Maserati 300S of Oscar Cabalén skidded off the track and into the crowd, causing numerous injuries.

At the end of the third lap, Collins retired his Ferrari 290 S with dangerously low oil pressure, meanwhile, Moss was marching way at the head of field, now being followed by Gregory, de Portago and Behra. Lap after lap, Moss continued to pull away from the field. On lap 24, he set the fastest lap of the race, before handing the car over to Fangio, who drove at the same feverish pace, increasing their advantage and wreaking havoc among his followers.  Lap 56, was the Ferrari of Musso abandon the race with an ignition fault, meanwhile a lap later, Fangio heads into the pits with insurmountable problems with the differential.

Brought about by the numerous retirements and changes in the composition of the works Italian teams, as a result of the withdrawal of the Moss/Fangio Maserati, the Temple Buell Ferrari lead the Ferrari of de Portago/Collins and the Maserati of Behra/Carlos Menditéguy. This Maserati pairing are joined by Moss. Taking all conceivable risks, Moss is able to relive the second Ferrari, now being driven by Castellotti, of second place on lap 88. At every turn, Moss reduces the lead, but the partnership of Gregory/Castellotti/Musso hold to take the spoils, winning in a time of 6hrs 10:29.9 mins., averaging a speed of 100.775 mph. In second was the sole remaining Officine Alfieri Maserati of Behra/ Menditéguy/Moss, albeit 83.5 seconds drift. The podium was complete by the Scuderia Ferrari, of de Portago/Collins/Castellotti, who were a 66.2 seconds back.

As a result of Fangio’s retirement, Moss and Menditéguy in car number 31, took an impressive victory,

Official Classification

Class Winners are in Bold text.

 Fastest Lap: Stirling Moss, 3:47.6secs (105.830 mph)

Class Winners

Standings after the race

Note: Only the top five positions are included in this set of standings.
Championship points were awarded for the first six places in each race in the order of 8-6-4-3-2-1. Manufacturers were only awarded points for their highest finishing car with no points awarded for positions filled by additional cars. Only the best 4 results out of the 7 races could be retained by each manufacturer. Points earned but not counted towards the championship totals are listed within brackets in the above table.

References

1000 km Buenos Aires
1000 km Buenos Aires
Buenos Aires